Happy Families is a traditional card game.

Happy Families may also refer to

 Happy Families (books), a series of children's books
 Happy Families (1989 TV series), a British children's television series based on the series of books of the same title
 Happy Families (1985 TV series), a British television comedy series
 Happy Families (1993 TV series), a British television game show
 Happy Families (play), a play by John Godber
Happy Families (album), a 1982 album by Blancmange
 Happy Families, a 1990 album by Maddy Prior and Rick Kemp